The Miami Tropics were a professional American football team based in Miami, Florida that played in the Spring Football League in 2000. The Tropics Head Coach was Jim Jensen, who played for the Miami Dolphins. The Tropics played their home games at the Miami Orange Bowl. The Tropics were the only team in the SFL that played in an NFL market at the time.

Tropics players of note:

James Burgess- (Miami, San Diego Chargers)
James Stewart - (Miami, Minnesota Vikings)
Nakia Reddick - (Indianapolis Colts, Carolina Panthers)
Harvey Wilson - (Indianapolis Colts)
Antron Wright - (Baltimore Ravens)

The Tropics would play the very last professional football game at the Miami Orange Bowl.

References

External links
CBS highlight of Houston Marshals vs Miami Tropics via YouTube
Clips of the San Antonio Matadors vs the Miami Tropics via YouTube

American football teams in Miami
2000 establishments in Florida
2000 disestablishments in Florida
American football teams established in 2000
American football teams disestablished in 2000